Mata Raj Kaur Institute of Engineering & Technology, Rewari is affiliated with Maharshi Dayanand University, Rohtak in Gangoli Saharanwas village in Rewari district of Haryana The student participate at regular interval to various places for industrial training. In November 2013 students participate in ROBOGLAXY in Bangalore, In May 2011 in annual function various ministers participated in the prize distribution. The college has constituted Anti-ragging cell in August 2010.

Governing Body
Its governing body members are as under;
 Chairperson- Anil Rao.
 Secretary- Rao Kamalbir Singh. 
 Managing director- Abhimanyu Rao. 
 Co-chairperson- Aayushi Rao.

References

Engineering colleges in Haryana
Rewari district
2009 establishments in Haryana
Educational institutions established in 2009